Pontrilas railway station is a former station which served the Herefordshire villages of Pontrilas and Ewyas Harold, and was a little distance from Grosmont, in Monmouthshire, Wales.  It was located on the Welsh Marches Line between Hereford and Abergavenny. The Golden Valley Railway ran from here through to the Midland Railway line at Hay on Wye. The station is now a private house with attached self-catering holiday cottage created from the former waiting room.

The station closed in 1958 (see Pontrilas).

The remaining railway infrastructure includes the operating signal box. The sidings are still in use for infrastructure work and, less often, as a freight loop. It is at the end of the long climb from Abergavenny; freight and steam specials on this route provide a noisy spectacle coming through the station site. In the southbound direction the long section between Pontrilas and Abergavenny frequently results in trains being held here awaiting a clear run into Abergavenny.

The branch line junction and bridge, crossing the A465 onto the Golden Valley Railway, has been demolished in road widening - only the abutment to the bridge remains.

During the 1990s rail freight operated to this set of sidings, delivering wood to Pontrilas Sawmill. Plans were even mooted to open a short siding into it; this would have had to cross the A465 or replace the missing Golden Valley bridge so was unlikely. Freight traffic ended when British Rail closed its Freightliner service.

A large online model railway retailer - OnTracks.co.uk – was based in the business unit below the signal box. The unit is now occupied by Golden Valley Hobbies who operate a similar online store. 

There are plans to open a new station for the village.

In March 2020, a bid was made to the Restoring Your Railway fund to get funds for a feasibility study into reinstating the station. This bid was unsuccessful.

References

Further reading

Disused railway stations in Herefordshire
Former Great Western Railway stations
Railway stations in Great Britain closed in 1854
Railway stations in Great Britain closed in 1958